David Wesley Griggs (February 5, 1967 – June 19, 1995) was a outside linebacker in the National Football League for six seasons, compiling 14.5 sacks, 1 interception, and four fumble recoveries. He started in Super Bowl XXIX for the San Diego Chargers. Griggs attended the University of Virginia. He grew up in Delair in Pennsauken Township, New Jersey, where he attended and played football for Pennsauken High School. He died at the age of 28 in Fort Lauderdale, Florida in 1995 when his speeding car slid off an expressway ramp from Florida's Turnpike and collided with a sign pole.

References

1967 births
1995 deaths
Sportspeople from Miami Beach, Florida
American football linebackers
Virginia Cavaliers football players
Miami Dolphins players
San Diego Chargers players
Road incident deaths in Florida
Pennsauken High School alumni
People from Pennsauken Township, New Jersey
Players of American football from Camden, New Jersey